Centa may refer to:

Čenta, Serbia, a village
Centa, Velike Lašče, Slovenia, a settlement
Antonio Centa (1907–1979), Italian actor
Centa (river), Italian river

See also
Di Centa, surname